The 6th Nuestra Belleza México pageant, was held at Lienzo Charro "Cuna de la Charrería" in Pachuca, Hidalgo, Mexico on September 12, 1999. Thirty-two contestants of the Mexican Republic competed for the national title, which was won by Leticia Murray from Sonora, who later competed at Miss Universe 2000 in Cyprus. Murray was crowned by outgoing Nuestra Belleza México titleholder Silvia Salgado. She is the second blonde and only Sonorense to win this title.

The Nuestra Belleza Mundo México title was won by Danette Velasco from Distrito Federal, who later competed at Miss World 1999 in United Kingdom. Velasco was crowned by outgoing Nuestra Belleza Mundo México titleholder Vilma Zamora. She was the first Capitalina to win this title.

This year the Nuestra Belleza México Organization obtained the Miss International pageant franchise and Lynette Delgado from Sinaloa won the Nuestra Belleza Internacional México title (Miss Dorian Grey), and she would compete in Miss International 1999 in Japan but she resigned to the title days after. She was the first Sinaloense to win this Title. In her place Graciela Soto from Morelos was her replacement in Miss International 1999 and then the first Morelense to win this title.

Leticia Murray from Sonora was designated by the Nuestra Belleza México Organization as Nuestra Belleza Internacional México 2000 and competed in Miss International 2000 in Japan where she was a Semi-finalist in the Top 15. She was the first Sonorense to win this Title.

Results

Placements

Order of announcements

Top 10
Aguascalientes
Baja California Sur
Chihuahua
Distrito Federal
Guanajuato
Morelos
Nuevo León
Sinaloa
Sonora
Tamaulipas

Top 5
Distrito Federal
Morelos
Sinaloa
Sonora
Tamaulipas

Special awards

National costume competition
In this competition the contestants are not evaluated, only the costumes. It is a competition showing the country's wealth embodied in the colorful and fascinating costumes made by Mexican designers combining the past and present of Mexico.

For the Nuestra Belleza México Organization this event is very important because it discloses the creative work of the great Mexican designers and also elects the costume to represent Mexico in Miss Universe the next year. Also, some costumes are elected to represent Mexico in other beauty contests.

The winning costume designer receives the "Aguja Diamante Award".

  – "Catrina"
  – "Coyoehauxtli"
  – "Reina Calafia"
  – "Teocentli, El Maíz" (Best National Costume in Miss Universe 2000)
  – "Kikapú"
  – "Princesa Azteca"
  – "Diosa Prehispánica"
  – "Frutos de la Tierra"
  Distrito Federal – "Princesa Maya"
  – "Durango Mágico"
  Estado de México – "Quihuicolo"
  – "Xochiquetzalli"
  – "Pai-Pai"
  – "La Mujer del Valle"
  – "Charra de Gala Cachiruleado"
  – "Ceremonial de Michoacán"

  – "La Hermosa Doncella de Xóchitl"
  – "Rurabe"
  – "Paz Mexicana"
  – "Flor de Piña"
  – "China Poblana de Gala"
  – "Aldeano"
  – "Princesa Caribeña"
  – "Orígenes de Grandeza"
  – "Realeza Mexicana"
  – "Raíces Sonorenses"
  – "Mariposa Monarca"
  – "Regina"
  – "Huapango"
  – "Sinfonía Marina"
  – "Princesa Maya"
  – "Zacatecas Tierra Fértil"

Judges
Joss-Claude – Stylist
Montserrat Olivier – Actress, TV Presenter & Model
Rodolfo Cavalcani – Employer
Beatríz Calles – Designer
Juan José Origel – Journalist & TV Host
Maxine Woodside – Journalist
Luz María Zetina – Nuestra Belleza México 1994 & Actress
Nicole Roxin – Photographer
Gabriel Soto – El Modelo México 1996, Actor & Singer

Contestants

Significance
Sonora won the Nuestra Belleza México title for the first time.
This year the crown of Nuestra Belleza México suffers his second change, this new model would continue until 2005.
Distrito Federal won the Nuestra Belleza Mundo México title for the first time.
Sinaloa was the Suplente/1st Runner-up and won the Nuestra Belleza Internacional México title for the first time.
For the first time a Titleholder resigned to the title (Lynette Delgado, Nuestra Belleza Internacional México 1999).
Morelos was appointed as Nuestra Belleza Internacional México after the resignation of Lynette Delgado from Sinaloa.
This year the organization welcomed the entry into a new millennium with the second Official Anthem of the pageant, which was interpreted by the 32 participants at the opening of the contest, also this year the organization made a special event called "Nuestra Belleza México Milenio".
For the first time an Afro-Mexican compete in the Nuestra Belleza México pageant (Elsa Aguilar from Oaxaca).
Jalisco wasn't called to the semi-finals after it had been doing since 1994.
Baja California Sur was called to the semi-finals for the first time.
Distrito Federal and Nuevo León placed for sixth consecutive year.
Guanajuato placed for third consecutive year.
Chihuahua placed for second consecutive year.
Aguascalientes, Morelos, Sinaloa and Tamaulipas returned to making calls to the semi-finals after two years (1997) while Sonora after three years (1996).
States that were called to the semi-finals last year and this year failed to qualify were Coahuila, Jalisco, Nayarit, Puebla, Quintana Roo, Tabasco and Yucatán.
Marco Antonio Regil hosted the pageant for second consecutive time with Lupita Jones.
Sinaloa won Miss Photogenic, Miss Personality and Miss Dorian Grey awards for the first time.
Tamaulipas won the Best Hair Award for the first time and the Skin Hinds award for second time after three years (1996).
Campeche won the Best Regional Costume for the first time.
The host delegate, Monserrat Jaime from Hidalgo, failed to place in the semi-finals.
Baja California Sur (Clara Sández), Sonora (Leticia Murray) and Yucatán (Katty Risueño) are the higher delegates in this edition (1.78 m).
Campeche Jocelyn Selem), Colima (Marcela Bueno), Estado de México (Itzanami Bermudez), Hidalgo (Monserrat Jaime), Puebla (Aurora Lamini), Quintana Roo (Valeria de Anda), San Luis Potosí (Ana María Iglesias) and Tabasco (Ana Marina Valenzuela) are the lower delegates in this edition (1.68 m).

Contestant notes
 Distrito Federal – Danette Velasco represented the country in Miss World 1999 held at Olympia Hall in London, England on December 4, 1999, but she didn't place.
 – Graciela Soto was selected by Lupita Jones to represent Mexico in Miss International 1999 held at the U-Port Hall, Tokyo, Japan on December 14, 1999 but She didn't place. After having won the franchise of that competition to the contest brother Señorita México although it only lasted two years (1999 & 2000).
 – Elsa Aguilar is sister of Ángeles Aguilar Nuestra Belleza Oaxaca 2008 also is the daughter of Agustin Aguilar Roca, who was Mr. Oaxaca in 1972, as well as Ángeles del Puerto Muñoz, who represented Oaxaca in Señorita Mexico in 1968. Actually she is the State Sub-Director of Nuestra Belleza Oaxaca. She was the first Afro-Mexican to compete in the Nuestra Belleza México pageant.
 – Lynette Delgado won the right to represent Mexico in Miss International 1999 but she resigned to the title. Much has been said that it was a nerve that Lynette remain as Suplente/1st Runner-up, being that she was considered the most beautiful of the 5 finalists to go to one of the two major pageants, so Lynette renounced the title and she was replaced by the 2nd Runner-up Graciela Soto.
 – Leticia Murray in Miss Universe 2000 held at Eleftheria Stadium in Nicosia, Cyprus won two awards: Best National Costume and Clairol Style, although she failed to place in the semifinals. She was also selected to compete in Miss International 2000 held at the Koseinenkin Hall in Tokyo, Japan on October 14, 2000, where she was called to the semi-finalists.
 – Rosa María Aragón is sister of Mónica Aragón, Nuestra Belleza Tamaulipas 2001.
 – Valeria De Anda competed in Miss Costa Maya International 2000.

Crossovers

Contestants who had competed or will compete at other beauty pageants:

Miss Universe
 2000: : Leticia Murray

Miss World
 1999:  Distrito Federal: Danette Velasco

Miss International
 1999: : Graciela Soto 
 2000: : Leticia Murray (Top 15)

Miss Costa Maya International
 2000: : Valeria De Anda

References

External links
Official Website

.México
1999 in Mexico
1999 beauty pageants